Mark Lee (born 31 May 1979 in Consett) is an English-Australian footballer.

Club career
As a junior, he was on the books at Middlesbrough, but failed to make the grade. In 1996, he signed as an apprentice at Scarborough, before moving to Scottish club Hibernian. In 1999, he has a trial with Perth Glory in Australia, but was not taken on. He then went to Lynn University in the United States and completed a degree in Sports Management. He subsequently played for several teams in the Western Australia State League, including Western Knights and ECU Joondalup, while working as a youth development coach. In 2005, he was named the Western Australia State League player of the year.
He also played for Blyth Spartans, Gateshead, Easington and Consett before heading back to Australia.

Perth Glory
In 2006, he joined Perth Glory, where he was originally signed as a replacement for the injured Bobby Despotovski, though Perth Glory since decided to extend his contract. He made his A-League debut on 10 December 2006 against Central Coast Mariners. He was released by Perth Glory at the end of 2009 for a second time and now owns his coaching company Mark Lee Football Coaching as well as Pro Football Training.

A-League career statistics 
(Correct as of 30 November 2008)

References

External links
 Perth Glory profile

1979 births
A-League Men players
English footballers
Hibernian F.C. players
Living people
Perth Glory FC players
Scarborough F.C. players
Sportspeople from Consett
Footballers from County Durham
Lynn Fighting Knights men's soccer players
Association football defenders
Western Knights SC players
Perth RedStar FC players